The US Post Office-Millbury Main is an historic building on 119 Elm Street in Millbury, Massachusetts.  The single story brick building was built in 1941, and has styling with Art Deco features.  It has a cupola with diamond-glass windows and a copper roof; the diamond window pattern also appears in the windows that flank and top the building's entrance.  The interior retains much of its original woodwork and styling, and includes a mural painted by Joe Lasker depicting a battle between Native Americans and English colonists.

The post office was listed on the National Register of Historic Places in 1987.

See also 

National Register of Historic Places listings in Worcester County, Massachusetts
List of United States post offices

References 

Millbury
Buildings and structures in Millbury, Massachusetts
National Register of Historic Places in Worcester County, Massachusetts